Sallustro is a surname. Notable people with the surname include:

Attila Sallustro (1908–1983), Italian-Paraguayan footballer
Oberdan Sallustro (1915–1972), Italian-Paraguayan businessman